Ranch to Market Road 187 (RM 187) is an  Ranch to Market Road located in Zavala, Uvalde, Bandera, and Kerr counties in the US state of Texas. The route passes through the cities of Sabinal, Utopia, and Vanderpool. The road helps connect several small south Texas ranches to major highways. RM 187 was first designated in 1945, and was extended three times during the 1940s. , it is the longest Ranch to Market Road in the state of Texas.

Route description
RM 187 begins at its southern terminus with US Highway 57 (US 57), near Batesville, as a paved, two-lane, asphalt road. RM 187 winds through several miles of Southern Texas grassland dotted with trees. The highway passes several large ranches and farms along this course and intersects with several county routes and private roads. For this stretch of the route, RM 187 is heading in a northeast direction. The two highways run concurrently for nearly  before FM 140 turns westward. RM 187 continues north through rolling grasslands for almost  before turning in a northeast direction. The route continues in this direction for about two miles before returning to a northerly direction. The highway continues through more hilly, rolling grasslands. A few miles later, the highway crosses the Sabinal River and proceeds past the Waresville cemetery, the Links of Utopia Golf Course, and the Utopia on the River Airport before passing through the "downtown" area of the village of Utopia.

Separating and running northward, RM 187 continues along the southwestern edge of the Lost Maples State Natural Area. The highway turns northeasterly through a long stretch of brushland before reaching its northern terminus at SH 39.

History
RM 187 was first designated as Farm to Market Road 187 (FM 187), a stretch of road going from Sabinal to the Bandera County line on June 11, 1945. Just 14 days later, on June 25, 1945, it was extended from the Bandera County line up to Vanderpool. The section of FM 187 south of Sabinal was redesignated as RM 187 in 1954. RM 187 was again extended south on March 24, 1954 to an intersection with FM 140. Shortly after that, the entire road was known as RM 187.

Major junctions

See also

References

Bibliography

External links

Farm to Market Roads in Texas
Ranch to Market Road 187
Ranch to Market Road 187
Ranch to Market Road 187
Ranch to Market Road 187